The Lola T330 was an open-wheel formula race car, designed, developed and built by Lola Cars, for Formula 5000 racing, in 1973.

References

T330
Formula 5000 cars